The 2020 Idaho State Bengals football team represented Idaho State University in the Big Sky Conference during the 2020–21 NCAA Division I FCS football season. Led by fourth-year head coach Rob Phenicie, the Bengals were 2–4 overall (2–4 in Big Sky, tied for fifth), and played their home games on campus at Holt Arena in Pocatello, Idaho.

Due to the COVID-19 pandemic, the season was delayed and started in late February 2021.

Previous season
The Bengals finished the 2019 season at 3–9 (2–6 in Big Sky, tied for ninth).

Preseason

Polls
On July 23, 2020, during the virtual Big Sky Kickoff, the Bengals were predicted to finish eleventh in the Big Sky by both the coaches and media.

Schedule
In late July, Idaho State and New Mexico agreed to move 2020 game from August 29 (week zero) to September 19.

Due to the COVID-19 pandemic, the season was delayed and started in late February 2021.

References

Idaho State
Idaho State Bengals football seasons
Idaho State Bengals football